Poggea is a genus of flowering plants belonging to the family Achariaceae.

Its native range is western Tropical Africa and it is found in Angola, Cabinda Province, Cameroon, Congo, Gabon and Zaïre.

The genus name of Poggea is in honour of Paul Pogge (1838–1884), a German explorer in Africa. It was first described and published in Bot. Jahrb. Syst. Vol.18 on page 162 in 1893.

Known species 
According to Kew:
Poggea alata 
Poggea gossweileri 
Poggea longepedunculata

References

Achariaceae
Malpighiales genera
Plants described in 1893
Flora of West-Central Tropical Africa
Flora of Angola